Bus stations in Perth, Western Australia, are owned by the Public Transport Authority and fall under the Transperth system. The majority of Perth's bus stations are located next to train stations.

Bus stations

Bus and train transfers

Future bus and train transfers

See also
List of bus routes in Perth, Western Australia
List of Transperth railway stations

References

Bus stations
Perth